Working Girl is the third studio album by English singer and songwriter Little Boots, released on 10 July 2015 by on Repeat Records and Dim Mak Records.

Promotion and release
On 5 November 2014, Little Boots released the single "Taste It", taken from her EP Business Pleasure, which was released in December 2014. On 5 May 2015, Little Boots released "Better in the Morning," and announced the following day that her new album would be titled "Working Girl" and would come out on 10 July 2015. The upcoming album's track list also accompanied the announcement.

Tour
In July 2015, Little Boots embarked on an eight-date tour to promote the album.

Commercial performance
Working Girl debuted at number 67 on the UK Albums Chart, selling 1,425 copies in its first week.

Track listing

Charts

Release history

References

2015 albums
Albums produced by Ariel Rechtshaid
Self-released albums
Little Boots albums